Nir Shavit is an Israeli computer scientist. He is a professor in the Computer Science Department at Tel Aviv University and a professor of electrical engineering and computer science at the Massachusetts Institute of Technology.

Nir Shavit received B.Sc. and M.Sc. degrees in computer science from the Technion - Israel Institute of Technology in 1984 and 1986, and a Ph.D. in computer science from the Hebrew University of Jerusalem in 1990. Shavit is a co-author of the book The Art of Multiprocessor Programming, is a winner of the 2004 Gödel Prize in theoretical computer science for his work on applying tools from algebraic topology to model shared memory computability, and a winner of the 2012 Dijkstra Prize for the introduction and first implementation of software transactional memory. He is a past program chair of the ACM Symposium on Principles of Distributed Computing (PODC) and the ACM Symposium on Parallelism in Algorithms and Architectures (SPAA).

His research covers techniques for designing, implementing, and reasoning about multiprocessors, and in particular the design of concurrent data structures for multi-core machines.

Recognition
 2004 Gödel prize
 2012 Dijkstra Prize
 2013 Fellow of the Association for Computing Machinery
Currently he has co-founded a company named Neural Magic along with Alexzander Mateev. The company claims to use highly sparse neural networks to make deep learning computationally so efficient that GPUs won't be needed. For certain use cases they claim a speed up of 175x.

References

External links
cs.tau.ac.il
csail.mit.edu

Living people
Dijkstra Prize laureates
Electrical engineering academics
Fellows of the Association for Computing Machinery
Gödel Prize laureates
Hebrew University of Jerusalem School of Computer Science & Engineering alumni
Israeli computer scientists
Israeli Jews
MIT School of Engineering faculty
Researchers in distributed computing
Technion – Israel Institute of Technology alumni
Year of birth missing (living people)
Theoretical computer scientists